Megan Isaacson is an American Gospel Music Association award winning  Christian and gospel singer.

Career 

Megan Isaacson was born in Austin, Texas. She started her career in 2000 when she flew to Australia to sing with the Continental Singers. Upon returning, she started touring with youth ministry, Dare 2 Share. Finally, in the early summer of 2005 she released her debut album Close. She also recorded her song 'Worship' which won her an award at the Gospel Music Association.

Isaacson once said, "I love, making music but more important to me than making music is helping people catch a glimpse of how valuable they are to God, which I show them through my music."

Discography

Albums

Awards and nominations

 Gospel Music Association- Song of The Year, winner

External links
 Megan Isaacson Official Website
 Youth Ministry - Dare 2 Share

Year of birth missing (living people)
American women singers
Singers from Colorado
Living people